West Charlotte (shown as Charlotte on federal topographic maps) is an unincorporated village and census-designated place (CDP) in the town of Charlotte, Chittenden County, Vermont, United States. It was first listed as a CDP prior to the 2020 census.

The CDP is in southwestern Chittenden County, in the western part of the town of Charlotte. U.S. Route 7 runs along the east side of the CDP, leading north  to Burlington and south  to Vergennes. Ferry Road passes through the center of the village, leading west to the Charlotte-Essex Ferry, crossing Lake Champlain to Essex, New York.

References 

Populated places in Chittenden County, Vermont
Census-designated places in Chittenden County, Vermont
Census-designated places in Vermont